The Olympic BMX Centre is a cycling venue, constructed  for the BMX racing events at the 2016 Summer Olympics in Rio de Janeiro, Brazil.

The surface was supplied by GreenSet.

Footnotes

References

rio2016.com Rio de Janeiro Olympic venues map

Venues of the 2016 Summer Olympics
BMX tracks
Sports venues in Rio de Janeiro (city)
Olympic cycling venues
Deodoro Olympic Park